Dr. Karla Sofen (also known as Moonstone, Meteorite, and Ms. Marvel) is a fictional character appearing in American comic books published by Marvel Comics. She first appeared in Captain America (vol. 1) #192, created by writer Marv Wolfman and artist Frank Robbins.

Moonstone is a former psychologist who got her powers from a fusion with a gravity stone designed by the alien Kree. The character has been depicted as both a supervillain and an anti-hero at various times in her publication history. She was a member of the Masters of Evil, Thunderbolts and the Dark Avengers, and in the latter group she temporally replaced Carol Danvers as Ms. Marvel.

Moonstone has been described as one of Marvel's most notable and powerful female supervillains.

Publication history
The character first appeared as a gun moll of the villain Dr. Faustus in Captain America (vol. 1) #192. She later appeared in issue #228 of The Incredible Hulk where it was revealed that she was the psychiatrist of the former Moonstone, Lloyd Bloch, and that she tricked him into relinquishing the moonstone to her. She was later revealed to be a member of the shadowy organization known as the Corporation.

She appeared in Avengers as part of the supervillain team the Masters of Evil. During the disappearance of the Avengers and the Fantastic Four (after the Onslaught crossover), the Masters of Evil, Moonstone (as Meteorite) included, posed as the new hero team called the Thunderbolts. After 12 issues, their true identities were exposed. Moonstone returned to the Thunderbolts series in 2007's Thunderbolts #110, as the team's new field leader.

Moonstone was one of the Thunderbolts' characters that Brian Michael Bendis moved over to the Dark Avengers, where she took on the identity of Ms. Marvel, and she became the main character in the Ms. Marvel solo title in issue #38. She appeared as a regular character in the Dark Avengers series from issue #1 (March 2009) through issue #16 (June 2010).

Moonstone returned to the Thunderbolts in issue #144, after the Dark Reign era.  She became part of a government program led by Luke Cage to reform villains.  Joining them was Juggernaut, Ghost, Crossbones, and Man-Thing. She remained with the team after the title transitioned into Dark Avengers beginning with issue #175.

Moonstone was also a member of the third Thunderbolts team, which was relaunched as part of the aftermath of Avengers: Standoff!. It was written by Jim Zub and drawn by Jon Malin, the team consists of Moonstone, The Winter Soldier, the Fixer, Atlas and MACH-V. The comic was cancelled after twelve issues due to the Secret Empire event.

Fictional character biography

Origins
Karla Sofen was born in Van Nuys, California. She grew up in the mansion of Hollywood producer Charles Stockbridge, as the child of the butler Karl Sofen. After her father's death, her mother Marion Sofen worked three jobs to put her daughter through college, and Karla vowed never to end up like her mother and that she would never put another's needs before her own. Despite building a successful practice as a psychologist and psychiatrist, Karla so disliked being dependent on her patients for income that she entered the super-criminal world as an aide to Doctor Faustus. Learning of Lloyd Bloch (a.k.a. the original Moonstone), she became the supervillain's psychologist and manipulated him into rejecting the source of his powers, an extraterrestrial gem of considerable power, which she then acquired and absorbed to gain the powers of Moonstone. She then battled the Hulk.

It has been revealed Karla murdered her mother by suffocating her and then set her house on fire. It has also been said that during Sofen's career as a psychologist, she convinced depressed patients to kill themselves while she watched, and was "instrumental in the therapeutic hospitalization of six more".

Masters of Evil
Karla Sofen worked briefly for the Corporation, controlling the Hulk and manipulating General Thunderbolt Ross into a nervous breakdown. She battled Captain America, Falcon, Hulk and Quasar on behalf of the Corporation. She continued to pursue greater power, stealing Curt Connors's Enervator and fighting Spider-Man in the process.

Egghead recruited her for the third Masters of Evil and she fought the Avengers. However, her tenure was short-lived as she surrendered after the Masters of Evil's defeat. It wasn't long before she broke out of confinement at Project: Pegasus with Blackout, the Rhino and Electro, battling the Avengers and escaping into the Darkforce dimension with Blackout. She traveled to the Moon in search for more moon stone fragments, where she battled Dazzler and the Inhumans, and was then returned to Pegasus.

Later, Baron Helmut Zemo recruited Moonstone for the fourth Masters of Evil. She participated in the Masters' takeover of Avengers Mansion, but attempted to manipulate the mentally damaged Blackout to her side to take position of team leader from Zemo. She subsequently battled Captain Marvel, but this confrontation ended with her being temporarily paralyzed when she crashed into a cliff during the fight and broke her neck. Healed by the power of the stone, she then had a rematch with Captain Marvel. Moonstone later battled Volcana. She was twice targeted by the original Moonstone, now known as Nefarius, first while going to court, and then when he got imprisoned in the Vault. Eventually, she decided to serve out her prison term.

Thunderbolts
When Baron Zemo formed a group of villains to masquerade as heroes, Moonstone was broken out of the Vault and she reluctantly returned to villainy as Meteorite, a member of the Thunderbolts.

Upon encountering a young victim of Arnim Zola's genetic manipulations, a youngster by the name of Jolt, Meteorite nudged Zemo into accepting her in the team. She soon became a mother figure to Jolt and used the enthusiasm to create a power-base inside the team, rallying the others behind her. Zemo exposed the true nature of the team, but Moonstone opposed Zemo, followed by MACH-1, Songbird and Jolt. Zemo had brainwashed the Fantastic Four and the Avengers, but the small team of Thunderbolts, with the help of Iron Man, was able to defeat Zemo and Techno. After the battle the Thunderbolts had decided to pay for their crimes, but they were unwittingly teleported to an alternate dimension.

In this world known as Kosmos, Moonstone led the team to safety from the Kosmosian army and eventually executed the Kosmosian Primotur to ensure their return to Earth. Inspired by Jolt, she made the Thunderbolts see that it would be preferable to work for their redemption as heroes, rather than to be in jail. After gaining fake identities for the team, she led them away from S.H.I.E.L.D. and the Lightning Rods, and she managed to defeat Graviton using her psychological skills, making Graviton see he was without a true goal and he was lacking vision. However, the Thunderbolts disagreed with her, for she merely thought of the present and did not care for the future consequences of her actions. When Hawkeye joined the team, claiming they would be pardoned if they followed the former member of the Avengers, she stepped down as leader.

Nightmares

Soon after the Thunderbolts fought the new Masters of Evil, a veritable army of supervillains, and Moonstone decided to betray the team. But something inside of her snapped, and she defeated Crimson Cowl and returned to the team.

Graviton returned weeks later, having pondered Karla Sofen's words.} Graviton took over the city of San Francisco, turning it into an island in the skies. The Thunderbolts attempted to stop this, but they were captured. Graviton offered Moonstone a place at his side, as a queen, but she laughed at this. As the youngest members of the team saved them, Moonstone wondered why she did not take Graviton's offer.

During a mission against the Secret Empire, she became romantically involved with Hawkeye. In Thunderbolts #30, Hawkeye invited Moonstone and Songbird to come train with him. While Songbird refused, Karla accepted. During the fight, Hawkeye praised Karla for being a woman in athletic condition. Moonstone, however, turned the tables, complimenting the fact that Hawkeye trained four hours a day to maintain peak human physical performance. Using psychological deduction, she picked up on Clint's attraction towards her. At the end of the issue, Karla slowly undresses herself as she and Clint begin to kiss. Songbird then walks in on their moment of intimacy.

But as time went by, she became haunted by nightmares of an ancient Kree warrior woman, who whispered in her thoughts. Soon after, the team was targeted by Scourge killing Jolt. The death of the youngster hit Karla deeply. Subsequently, Citizen V asked for help against her own team, the V-Battalion, and the Thunderbolts agreed to do so, engaging the V-Battalion's operatives in battle. Karla was torn about fighting them, for they were heroes. She released a surge of her powers to stop the fight, making them all intangible, and fled, trying to find out what was wrong with her. Her first stop was Attilan, but the Inhumans were gone. She then searched the Fantastic Four's computers and found the answer she was looking for.

She flew under her own power to the Blue Area of the Moon, where she sought the Kree Supreme Intelligence and demanded the truth. The Supreme Intelligence revealed to her that the fragment she referred to as the "moonstone" was part of a Kree Lifestone, which was used to empower the Guardians of the Galaxy centuries ago. Ajes'ha the Kree warrior woman that haunted her dreams was the previous owner of the moonstone, whose memory was etched into it, and kept steering Karla into the path of heroism. The Thunderbolts managed to catch up with her, and so did Captain Marvel offering her help. Led by Captain Marvel, the Thunderbolts went to Titan, where Mentor and ISAAC attempted to remove the moonstone from Karla's body. After a serious discussion about Karla's potential to do good, Mentor allowed her to keep the gem but erased the memory of the previous owner, leaving Karla's mind, and by consequence, her decisions, to herself.

Uncertain loyalties
Karla Sofen was soon contacted by Graviton who hired her as a tutor. In the following weeks, Karla helped Graviton understand and control his powers in ways he had not even dreamed, making him fall in love with her. Lifting hundreds of cities all over the world in a misguided attempt to reshape Earth into a semblance of his face, the Thunderbolts re-formed to stop him, only to find Karla at his side. In the end, she helped them stop Graviton. His power imploded, however, sending most of the Thunderbolts, including Karla, to Counter-Earth.

While trapped on Counter-Earth, Karla was given the task of reshaping the minds of the world's leaders, creating a new way of thought to ensure the survival of all. Soon after, Karla removed a second moonstone from that world's Lloyd Bloch (known as the Phantom Eagle), dramatically increasing her own powers. The Thunderbolts, along with Karla, eventually returned to their Earth.

"The Best Intentions"

When the Avengers later interfered in the Thunderbolts' plan to control the world's "transnormal energy", a failsafe was triggered; a device that Karla had planted in her private plot against Zemo. The stolen energy was funneled into her moonstones, further increasing her powers. Karla attempted to use this energy to flee, but the Thunderbolts and Avengers combined forces to stop her. In the end, Zemo ended up in possession of both moonstones and Karla was left comatose.

Since then, Zemo occasionally used her link to the moonstones to puppeteer her, but her mind remained shut down.

Return

Later the Commission on Superhuman Activities brought her body to their facility, where she and Songbird became mentally linked through the moonstones' power. Karla Sofen came out of her coma, and now has the moonstones in her possession again.

Moonstone next became the field leader of the revamped Thunderbolts, sponsored by the government. The Director of this team, the semi-insane Norman Osborn, eventually turned to blackmail to force her to join, threatening to remove her moonstone and put her in a coma if she refused. Moonstone is seen as a ruthless if less-than-capable leader of the Thunderbolts—Songbird describing her as someone who simply tells people what to do rather than coordinating them as a group—on one of their first missions (capturing the renegade Jack Flag), she preferred to have the mission finish early so that she could have sex with one of the government agents, a point stressed by Songbird at their next briefing. She is fully behind the Thunderbolts' new role and that they must rely on public approval to stay employed, but clashes with her teammate Songbird and her employer Osborn. She revealed that she had been influencing S.H.I.E.L.D. agents to give Norman placebos rather than the usual medication, and also that when Osborn was gone she planned to 'accidentally' kill Songbird in the field and take over as leader. She is shot through the wrist by a crossbow bolt by American Eagle, pinning her to their jet and tearing some of her wrist away. Blinded by rage, she subsequently orders Bullseye to cripple American Eagle who instead cripples Bullseye.

The Thunderbolts encountered Nova having just returned to Earth after Annihilation and had a tangle with Diamondhead. Moonstone advised her team not to underestimate his high power level, which they did, when Nova singlehandedly held his own against the Thunderbolts and even survived Penance's hyperkinetic shockwave. Iron Man and S.H.I.E.L.D. arrived just in time to defuse the situation before federal and galactic authority could conflict any further.

When the psychic supervillains, Mind-Wave, Caprice, Bluestreak and Mirage, are imprisoned in the Thunderbolt's base, they use their powers to alter the Thunderbolts' minds. They force Moonstone to attack Doc Samson and Penance. Penance manages to repel her with a powerful energy blast. It is later mentioned that Moonstone survived, but her body needs a fortnight to stabilize before she can be submitted to nanosurgery.

Secret Invasion

Moonstone is among four Thunderbolts members present during an attack on Thunderbolts Mountain by a renegade Skrull sleeper agent Khn'nr taking the form of Captain Marvel but has refused to follow programming and has pledged to defend the human race. During the battle, Khn'nr reveals that her stone is of Kree origin, and uses his energy-controlling abilities to shut it down. When the Thunderbolts attack and board a Skrull ship, the Swordsman confronts a group of them with the newly returned Andrea von Strucker. Moonstone painfully immobilizes Swordsman, and suggests an alliance to the Skrulls and Andrea. Andrea turns out not to be a Skrull, however, and attacks Moonstone, although Bullseye kills Andrea from behind. Bullseye tries to kill Moonstone as well, although she becomes intangible, and she threatens Bullseye in order to keep in line.

Later, Bullseye tries to kill Songbird under Osborn's orders. Songbird manages to get into the Zeus aircraft, and blows up part of the Thunderbolts' mountain headquarters. Moonstone survives because Bullseye had warned her to go intangible, and walks away saying "to Hell with this team". Moonstone was also among the fighters in the climactic battle against the Skrulls on Central Park, which ended as Osborn shot dead the alien Veranke.

Dark Reign

Norman Osborn approaches Moonstone while Karla Sofen is meditating and offers her a spot on the Dark Avengers. She is given the codename of Ms. Marvel as well as the original costume (reclaimed from Ultra Girl) after Carol Danvers (aka the original Ms. Marvel) refuses to follow Osborn. The costume is also scratched heavily by Tigra, causing an embarrassing exposure in front of the press. On this member of the Dark Avengers' first mission, Ms. Marvel is seen attacking which blasts Morgana le Fay off a dragon, causing Morgan to die in the present. After defeating Morgana, Moonstone flirts with Noh-Varr, and then eventually seduces and sleeps with him. While watching a televised interview that Norman is conducting, Karla tells Noh-Varr that the Dark Avengers are all criminals. This prompts Noh-Varr to leave the group. She would also get closer to Daken, saving him from the rubble after an explosion caused by the Fantastic Four, and following him to a Japanese restaurant to find out more about Daken's hidden personality traits.

As Karla takes on the Ms. Marvel mantle, she goes out patrolling and comes across some men robbing an armored car. After killing the men, Karla goes back to the Avengers Tower where Osborn informs her the Dark Avengers all have to undergo psychiatric evaluations and wants her to go first, wanting her professional opinion of Dr. Gerald Wright's skills. Dr. Wright turns out to be a psychic who wanted to kill the Dark Avengers for finding out they were criminals. However, Karla gets an upper hand on him as Wright gets overwhelmed discovering Karla had killed her mother and hated being seen as a criminal and a failure, and seemingly chokes Wright to death.

After being told by Norman to find A.I.M., Karla sorts through the original Ms. Marvel's A.I.M. leads and takes out an A.I.M. cell in Atlanta, Georgia. There she finds baby M.O.D.O.C.'s, enhanced to warp reality. They communicate with her telepathically, telling her that they need Ms. Marvel to save them. It is unclear if they are controlling her, or if she genuinely cares about them, but Karla takes them back to her room in the Avengers Tower for safe keeping. Almost immediately her room is blown apart by a strange yellow being, provoking Karla's rage. With the aid of Venom, Noh-Varr and Osborn, Karla manages to defeat the mysterious being and after a meeting with the Dark Avengers, the babies are moved to Thunderbolts' Mountain where they are stolen by Deadpool on behalf of A.I.M.

Later while flying through the city, Karla comes across a green version of Ms. Marvel's lightning bolt on the side of a building. Karla goes back to the Avengers Tower where Osborn informs her Deadpool stole the baby M.O.D.O.C.'s. Karla goes to confront him in Los Angeles. After defeating him, Karla comes across the New Avengers and four of the mysterious beings, each one a different color in an underground A.I.M. base. Trying to save the babies, Karla is too late to reach them as Spider-Man hooks them up to a machine. The four mysterious beings then merge and reform the original Ms. Marvel. Refusing to let her title be taken away, Karla attempts to pound Danvers, but strangely, no matter what she hits Danvers with, Danvers survived each and every blow. Eventually, it is discovered that Danvers has a counterpart named Catherine Donovan that in close proximity allows Danvers to be invulnerable. Donovan is subsequently killed by Osborn and is revealed to be a creation of the Storyteller whose persona then habits Karla's body as she is fighting Danvers. While trapped in her own body, Sofen is forced to confront her own identity and retakes her Moonstone mantle. As Moonstone, Sofen is able to expel Donovan's consciousness which merges with Danvers upon exit, thus making Ms. Marvel whole again. However, during their battle, Carol uses her own powers to remove the moonstone from Sofen, depowering her in the process. She tells Sofen that she learned a great deal about her while in her mind and offers her a chance at redemption. Knowing she will die in 72 hours without the moonstone's support, Carol hides it at the gravesite of Sofen's mother and gives her the opportunity to reexamine her life and stand against Osborn. Sofen finds the moonstone at her mother's grave, in a fury she smashes the headstone marking it and leaves.

Karla is sent out by Osborn to help quell the riots in San Francisco along with the other Dark Avengers and H.A.M.M.E.R. Outside the Castro Theatre, she takes out Nekra and Frenzy much to the surprise of Karma, Armor, and Bling. Later she comes into conflict with Rogue, accusing her of attacking an unconscious H.A.M.M.E.R. agent and viciously attacks her, though Rogue manages to trick her and escape. Karla is later informed of Trance's situation by H.A.M.M.E.R. agents and goes to confront her. After taking out Gambit and Danger, she gets into another fight with Rogue. Trance pulls herself together and attacks Karla. Under Rogue's orders, Trance and Gambit manage to successfully take down Karla before teleporting off with Pixie. During the final fight on Utopia, Karla takes on Nekra, Frenzy and Bling. She comes to Osborn's side telling him if they want to win, they'll have to kill them all but the whole world is watching and if they kill one, they'll have to kill them all and nobody comes back from committing genocide live on TV.

Alongside the Dark Avengers, Moonstone confronts Molecule Man in his hometown Dinosaur, Colorado, and an Absorbing Man which had harnessed the Cosmic Cube's powers.

Moonstone flirts with Bullseye, stating that she thinks Bullseye is a creep but finds "Hawkeye" attractive. Karla is caught having sex with Bullseye in the Avengers Tower meeting room in front of H.A.M.M.E.R. agents. This act is perceived as an act of rebellion from Karla against Osborn's rule over the Dark Avengers. Norman sends Victoria Hand to deal with the situation. Hand confronts Moonstone and Bullseye with a group of H.A.M.M.E.R agents. Moonstone disobeys Hand's orders, which prompts Hand to take out an alien weapon to shoot Moonstone, knocking her unconscious.

She is part of the team when they go look for Noh-Varr in Manhattan, after Sentry found him.

Prior to the attack on Asgard, Moonstone is approached by Mac Gargan, telling Karla of waking up 'sticky' after dreams and was wondering if she could help Venom. At first, she looks disgusted at Gargan's attempts to approach her. While this is happening, Daken walks up to her and calls her 'sweetheart'. Karla wraps her arm around Gargan's arm and spurns "Wolverine" in the process.

During Asgard's siege, Moonstone is seen helping Osborn defeat Thor. She is seen being chased away from the scene by Maria Hill. Moonstone turns intangible to avoid the bullets. Moonstone is one of the on-lookers when Sentry tears Ares in half. Moonstone is standing besides Osborn when the New Avengers, Young Avengers, and Nick Fury led by Steve Rogers arrive to assist the Asgardians. Rogers hits Osborn with the shield as Karla retreats back, prompting her to say "Well, I sure as @#$% saw this coming!". Karla engages in personal combat with Carol. Karla wins the exchange when Osborn interferes into the fight by blasting Danvers with an energy beam in the back. When Osborn is defeated by Rogers and Tony Stark, and reverts to the Green Goblin persona, Karla and Bullseye are seen in the distance. Both of them come to the realization that it would be a good time to leave the battle.

Moonstone, along with the other members of the Dark Avengers, are arrested by the Avengers. After Rogers does away with Osborn, Moonstone and Bullseye take the opportunity to attempt an escape. Danvers gives chase to Moonstone, only to have Karla fire on with an energy blast. When it seems she has escaped, Stark appears and punches her, knocking her out. At the same time, Bullseye is struck down by Luke Cage, sending the two villains falling unconscious to the ground, thus ending Moonstone's involvement.

Return to the Thunderbolts
Moonstone was confirmed as a member of the second Thunderbolts team, which was formed in the aftermath of Siege.

Luke Cage visitsed the women's section of the Raft, where he recruited Moonstone to be a member of the Thunderbolts once again. Moonstone claimed that "It is about time" someone came by to recruit her for the Thunderbolts, and that her "costume should be pressed". Moonstone's recruitment upset Songbird, but was insisted upon by higher authorities. After the members were selected, a test was given to see where the loyalties lay among the team. Moonstone showed to be one of the few who helped out Cage and the rest of the support team. During missions, Karla passively flirted with Cage, though she was rebuked by him and the rest of the team tried to manipulate him. She later stated that she genuinely respected his heroism.

During the Avengers: Standoff! storyline, Moonstone was an inmate of Pleasant Hill, a gated community established by S.H.I.E.L.D. Using the powers of Kobik, S.H.I.E.L.D. turned Moonstone into a baker that specializes in making cupcakes. Baron Zemo and Fixer restored her memory, she helped to assault a S.H.I.E.L.D. outpost that was used as Pleasant Hill City Hall.

Following the Pleasant Hill incident, Moonstone briefly joined up with Winter Soldier's incarnation of the Thunderbolts with the goal to prevent S.H.I.E.L.D. from continuing the Kobik Project. During an argument with Winter Soldier, Kobik lunged through Moonstone's chest, tearing out the Moonstone object and incapacitating Karla, she eventually gets the Moonstone back.

Moonstone later joined the Thunderbolts into fighting Baron Helmut Zemo's incarnation of the Masters of Evil which ended with the Thunderbolts defeated.

During the "Opening Salvo" part of the Secret Empire storyline, Moonstone defected to the Masters of Evil after Winter Soldier was sent back in time to World War II and Kobik was shattered. She assisted in gathering the pieces of Kobik.

Powers and abilities
Moonstone's powers derive from a Kree gravity stone (found on Earth's moon), charged with unknown energy and bonded to her nervous system.

She can use the stone to fly, and to become intangible to pass through solid objects (while intangible she is immune to some magic-based attacks). She can project laser-like energy beams from her hands (able to penetrate steel plates), and has shown the ability to discharge non-coherent light in a blinding flash. Additionally, her bond with the stone grants her superhuman strength, stamina, speed and reflexes, as well as enhanced healing sufficient to recover her from a broken neck with enough time.

During the period when Moonstone had absorbed a second gravity stone, she displayed the ability to control gravitational forces, enabling her to move and manipulate matter, to create force fields, to increase gravity around a target and crush it, to generate miniature black holes, and even transport objects through dimensional rifts. Moonstone is vulnerable to astrally-projected beings and energy forms even while in her intangible state. It has been revealed that Moonstone's gravity stone is connected to her own life-force; if she were separated from it for more than 72 hours, she would die.

In addition to these powers, Karla Sofen has extensive knowledge of psychology and psychiatry, and has an M.D., specializing in psychiatry. She often uses this expertise to manipulate those around her for personal gain. However, she has occasionally shown to not be as skilled as she likes to believe, resulting in her being outmanipulated by more experienced opponents.

Reception

Critical reception 
Gavin Jasper of Den of Geek stated, "With Dark Avengers being the antithesis of early Thunderbolts, you have Karla Sofen as the common factor, existing on both teams. Moonstone, branding herself as Ms. Marvel during this series, is a really fascinating character. She’s a self-serving master manipulator who lacks megalomaniacal goals. Sure, she’s interested in great power, but doesn’t care for the great responsibility that comes with it. She doesn’t want to rule the world because it’s simply too much work. She’d rather take advantage of people for her own personal gain as long as possible until it’s time for her to move on." Peter Eckhardt of CBR.com wrote, "Though a master manipulator like the Enchantress, Sofen holds little goals beyond gaining more personal power and status. Moonstone is powerful, cruel, and a critical component of many versions of the team. Her desire for power, her ability to gain it, and her generally evil nature are what put her in the Masters of Evil Hall of Fame." Xandra Harbet of Lopper said, "Every badass heroine needs a proper female villain, and Moonstone, also known as Dr. Karla Sofen, is one of the best around. The former psychologist first appears in the Captain America comics in 1975, later snaking her way into the lives of multiple Marvel heroes. She eventually finds herself wreaking havoc on Captain Marvel's life, solidifying herself as one of Carol's greatest foes." Philip Etemesi of Screen Rant asserted, "Sofen has an incredible run as both a main villain and henchwoman. During her stints as a member Baron Zemo's Masters of Evil and Norman Osborne's Thunderbolts, she is shown to be the most competent baddie, almost defeating the Avengers on several occasions. And she gets to have her own mind-blowing schemes too, such as when she takes over a health facility to work on a drug to raise the dead."

Accolades 

 In 2009, IGN included Karla Sofen's Ms. Marvel persona in their "Marvel's Femme Fatales" list.
 In 2018, CBR.com ranked Moonstone 4th in their "Dark Avengers: The 15 Most Powerful Members" list.
 In 2019, CBR.com ranked Moonstone 4th in their "20 Powerful Female Marvel Characters We Hope To See In The MCU's Phase Four" list, 5th in their "10 Iconic Villains" list, and 7th in their "All Of The Dark Avengers, Ranked" list.
 In 2020, Scary Mommy included Moonstone in their "Looking For A Role Model? These 195+ Marvel Female Characters Are Truly Heroic" list.
 In 2021, Screen Rant included Moonstone in their "Hawkeye's 10 Best Relationships In Marvel Comics" list.
 In 2021, Sideshow included Moonstone in their "Five Characters We Want To Debut In The Falcon And The Winter Soldier" list.
 In 2022, CBR.com ranked Moonstone 1st in their "10 Marvel Villains Who Need Their Own Comic" list, 2nd in their "The 10 Best Masters Of Evil Members" list, 6th in their "Marvel: The 10 Strongest Female Villains" list, and 7th in their "Thunderbolts' 10 Best Leaders" list.
 In 2022, Screen Rant ranked Moonstone 4th in their "Main Comic Book Villains Ranked Lamest To Coolest" list, 6th in their "10 Most Powerful Variants Of Ms. Marvel" list,  and included her in their "10 Best Doctors In Marvel Comics list, and in their"10 Best Captain Marvel Comics Characters Not In The MCU" list.

Other versions

Marvel Zombies 
Moonstone appears alongside the Thunderbolts in the "Dead Days" one-shot of the Marvel Zombies mini-series using her alias of Meteorite.  She attacks Thor, pouncing on him but is stunned with a blast of lightning and then destroyed when Thor smashes her head.

Old Man Hawkeye 
In the miniseries Old Man Hawkeye, Moonstone was a member of the Thunderbolts who  betrayed and killed the Avengers, and hid herself in the Canadian Rockies after disagreements with Baron Zemo. 45 years later, she is met by Hawkeye and Kate Bishop in a village where Karla is worshipped for her immense powers, with her body severely decayed by the alien artifact that is the source of her powers. After a short discussion, Moonstone attempted to kill the Hawkeyes, but they managed to overload her moonstone, causing it to explode and kill Karla and her followers.

In other media

Television
 Karla Sofen as Moonstone appears in The Avengers: United They Stand episode "Command Decision," voiced by Susan Roman. This version is a member of Helmut Zemo's Masters of Evil.
 Karla Sofen appears in Avengers Assemble, voiced by Elizabeth Daily. She first appears as Moonstone of the Masters of Evil in "Under Siege" before appearing as Meteorite of the Thunderbolts in the group's self-titled episode and "Thunderbolts Revealed".

Video games
 Karla Sofen as Moonstone appears in Marvel: Ultimate Alliance 2, voiced by Tessa Auberjonois.
 Karla Sofen as Moonstone appears as a boss and unlockable playable character in Marvel: Avengers Alliance.
 Karla Sofen as Moonstone appears as a playable character in Marvel Puzzle Quest.
 Karla Sofen as Meteorite and Moonstone appears as a playable character in Lego Marvel's Avengers via the "Thunderbolts" and "Marvel's Women of Power" DLCs respectively.
 Karla Sofen as Moonstone appears as a playable character in Marvel Future Fight.

References

External links
 Moonstone at Marvel.com
 

Characters created by Frank Robbins
Characters created by Marv Wolfman
Comics characters introduced in 1975
Fictional American psychiatrists
Fictional characters from Los Angeles
Fictional characters who can manipulate light
Fictional characters who can turn intangible
Fictional female doctors
Marvel Comics characters who can move at superhuman speeds
Marvel Comics characters with accelerated healing
Marvel Comics characters with superhuman strength
Marvel Comics female superheroes
Marvel Comics female supervillains
Marvel Comics mutates